Qiaodong District may refer to the following locations in Hebei, China:

Qiaodong District, Shijiazhuang, merged into Chang'an and Qiaoxi districts in 2014.
Qiaodong District, Xingtai
Qiaodong District, Zhangjiakou